Kandanad Valiyapally aka St. Mary's Orthodox Cathedral, Kandanad is a cathedral in the Kandanad village of Ernakulam District of Kerala. Believed to have been originally constructed circa 4th century AD, it has been administered by Diocese of Kandanad of the Malankara Orthodox Syrian Church. From 1974 to 2019, the Jacobite Syrian Orthodox Church administered the cathedral.

Location
Kandanad is a village in the Ernakulam Dt. of Kerala. The church is located near to Udayamperoor and Mulamthuruthy in Ernakulam, Kerala, India.

History

The church is believed to be built in circa 4th century before the arrival of Portuguese in India. It has a magnificent edifice completed in 1910. On the Madbha, we could see two wooden planks on the Altar on which it is inscribed the date of completion of building works. On the wall it is inscribed that the church was consecrated in 4th century.

Kandanad Valiyapally is one of the important churches of the Malankara Orthodox Syrian Church. It is the church with a tomb of few Orthodox priests who travelled from Mosul to the Saint Thomas Christian community in Kerala.

We could see the sacred tombs of Mar Thoma IV and Saint Baselios Shakralla and this saint was a bishop in the  Orthadox church, Baselios Sakralla 3rd of Aleppo was the Maphriyano (Catholicos) of the Orthodox Church of the East from 1748 to 1760, buried below the altar room.

World famous missionary Claudius Buchanan visited this church in 1806 to understand more about Syrian Christians practices and traditions. This clearly tells us about the importance and stature of this holy church in the Orthodox Church, even centuries before.

Kandanad Padiyola

Kandanad Church is also famous for the  Kandanad Padiyola.

In 1843 there was another Sunahados held over here,  which is known as the 'Second Kandanad Sunnahados' in church history.

References

Churches in Ernakulam district
Cathedrals in Kerala
Churches completed in 1400
15th-century churches in India
15th-century establishments in India
15th-century Oriental Orthodox church buildings